Getap is an Argentine radio program, aired in Vorterix.

Awards
 2013 Martín Fierro Awards
 Best journalist program.
 Best female journalist (Romina Manguel)

References
 

Argentine radio programs